All American Bluegrass Girl is the 11th album released from bluegrass musician Rhonda Vincent. The album was released on May 23, 2006, via Rounder Records. The album features 12 songs. Three of which Vincent wrote or co-wrote. Also included on the album are two duets. Dolly Parton sings on "Heartbreaker's Alibi", and a duet with Bobby Osborne on "Midnight Angel".

"Heartbreaker's Albi" and the title track were both released as singles to radio. Although neither one charted, the album reached #1 on the Top Bluegrass Albums, #43 on the Top Country Albums, and #14 on the Top Heatseekers.

Track listing 

 "All American Bluegrass Girl" (Rhonda Vincent) - 3:10
 "Forever Ain't That Long Anymore" (Blake Williams, Wayne Southards) - 3:29
 "Heartbreaker's Alibi" (Honey Brassfield) - 3:00
 duet with Dolly Parton
 "God Bless the Soldier" (R. Vincent) - 2:40
 "Rhythm of the Wheels" (Al Wood) - 3:30
 "Midnight Angel" (Bobby Osborne, Pete Goble, Brian Vincent) - 3:11
 duet with Bobby Osborne
 "Till They Come Home" (Byron Hill, Mike Dekle) - 4:09
 "Don't Act" (Connie Leigh) - 2:13
 "Jesus Built a Bridge to Heaven" (Mark Kevin Grantt, Glen Duncan) - 3:06
 "Prettiest Flower There" (Val Johnson) - 3:29
 "Ashes of Mt. Augustine" (R. Vincent) - 3:29
 "Precious Jewel" (Roy Acuff) - 4:03

Personnel
 Hunter Berry – fiddle
 Charlie Cushman – banjo
 Stuart Duncan – fiddle, mandolin
 Kevin "Swine" Grantt – double bass
 Cody Kilby – acoustic guitar
 Randy Kohrs – dobro
 Andy Leftwich – mandolin
 Aaron Minick – box
 Bobby Osborne – duet vocals on "Midnight Angel"
 Dolly Parton – duet vocals on "Heartbreaker's Alibi"
 Tom Roady – percussion
 Steve Sheehan – acoustic guitar
 Adam Steffey – mandolin
 Bryan Sutton – Archguitar, acoustic guitar
 Darrin Vincent – double bass, backing vocals
 Rhonda Vincent – mandolin, vocals
 Josh Williams – acoustic guitar, mandolin, backing vocals

Chart performance

Album

Singles

References 

2006 albums
Rounder Records albums
Rhonda Vincent albums